Daniel A. Bailey (June 5, 1894 – June 4, 1970) served in the Pennsylvania State Senate from 1963 to 1970.

References

1970 deaths
Republican Party Pennsylvania state senators
1894 births
20th-century American politicians